École d'ingénieurs des sciences aérospatiales (ELISA Aerospace) a French engineering College created in 2009.

The school trains engineers in aeronautics and aerospace in 5 years after the Baccalauréat.

Located in Saint-Quentin, as well as in Saint-Jean-d'Illac since 2021, the ELISA is a private higher education institution of general interest recognised by the State. The school is a member of the Union of Independent Grandes Écoles (UGEI).

References

External links
 ELISA Aerospace

Engineering universities and colleges in France
ELISA
Aisne
Educational institutions established in 2009
2009 establishments in France